Dude Harlino (born in Jakarta, Indonesia on December 2, 1980) is an Indonesian actor of Minangkabau descent.

Biography
Dude Harlino was born in Jakarta on 2 December 1980 and his name, Dude, is taken from the Indonesian form of his birthdate, Dua December. He attended the banking program at the University of Indonesia, graduating in 1999.

He acted in the sinetron (Indonesian soap opera) Di Sini Ada Setan, as well as its film adaptation. In 2009 it was reported that he earned Rp 25 million (US$3,000) per episode.

In 2011, Harlino played an uztad in Ketika Cinta Bertasbih 2. That year he also opened his first entrepreneurial venture, Sushi Miya8i, with several other entertainers. He has expressed interest in opening a private school in the near future.

Style
Nauval Yazid, writing for the Jakarta Globe, notes that Harlino tends to play characters who are moral yet spiritually conflicted.

Recognition
Harlino received the Panasonic Award for favourite actor in 2007; the following year, he was nominated in the Best Actor category. He won the Panasonic Award for favourite actor again in 2010.

Personal life
Harlino has often played alongside Naysila Mirdad as lovers, leading to the two being called the "Dunay Lover"; at the time the two were also reported to be dating, although both denied it. , Harlino is dating Asmirandah, with whom he costarred in Dalam Mihrab Cinta. But the relationship ended in December 2011 shortly after announcing their engagement because she left him for Jonas Rivanno.

Harlino is known as a devout Muslim, who often prays on set while filming. He has expressed interest in becoming a preacher of Islam if he is no longer able to act.

Filmography

Feature films 
 Tusuk Jelangkung (Stab of the Jelangkung; 2002)
 Di Sini Ada Setan (Here is Satan; 2003)
 Gue Kapok Jatuh Cinta (I Give Up on Falling In Love; 2005)
 Ketika Cinta Bertasbih 2 (2009)
 Dalam Mihrab Cinta (Shielded by Love; 2010)

Soap operas 

Janji Hati 2 (The Heart's Promise 2; 1999)
Tersanjung 2 (Pleased 2; 1999)
Bidadari 1 (Angel 1; 2000)
Kalau Cinta Jangan Marah (When in Love, Don't Be Angry; 2001)
 ABG ("The Teen"; 2001)
 Sephia (2002)
 Siapa Takut Jatuh Cinta (Who Is Afraid of Falling In Love; 2002)
Yang Muda Yang Bercinta (The Young Fall in Love; 2002)
 Cintaku Di Kampus Biru (My Love on the Blue Campus; 2003)
 Who Ai Ni Indonesia (2003) Disini Ada Setan (There are Devils Here; 2003)
 Kisah Sedih Di Hari Minggu (A Sad Story on Sunday; 2004)
 Bawang Merah Bawang Putih (Onion and Garlic; 2004)
 Kisah Adinda (Adinda's Story; 2004)
 Cewek Cewek Badung (The Naughty Girl; 2004)
 Ada Apa Denganmu (What's Up With You; 2005)
 Dara Manisku (My Sweet Maiden; 2005)
 Khayalan Tingkat Tinggi (High-level Imagining; 2005)
 Cincin (Ring; 2006)
 Dua Hati (Two Hearts; 2006)

 Anakku Bukan Anakku (My Child is Not My Child; 2006)
 Pintu Hidayah (Door to Blessings; 2006)
 Intan (2006–2007)
 SurgaMu (Your Heaven; 2007)Maha Kaish (The All-Giving; 2007)Maha Cinta (The All-Loving; 2007)
 Kakak Iparku 17 Tahun (My Older Sibling-in-law is 17 Years Old; 2007)
 Janji (Promises; 2007)
 Aisyah (2007)
 Cahaya (Light; 2007)
 Aqso & Madina (2008)
 Nikita (2009)
 Manohara (2009)
 Doa dan Karunia (Prayer and Blessings; 2009)
 Seindah Senyum Winona (As Beautiful as Winona's Smile; 2009)
 Ketika Cinta Bertasbih Spesial Ramadhan (2010)
 Dia Jantung Hatiku (S/he's My Heart and Soul; 2010–2011)
 Ketika Cinta Bertasbih Meraih Ridho Ilahi (2011)
 Dari Sujud Ke Sujud (From Sujud  to Sujud; 2011)
 Dewa (2011)
 Jodohku ("My Mate"; 2013)
 Cinta Anak Cucu Adam'' (2014)

References
Footnotes

Bibliography

External links

Living people
1980 births
People from Jakarta
Indonesian male actors
Indonesian male television actors
Indonesian Muslims
University of Indonesia alumni